Anthony Roberts (born 1970) is an Australian politician.

Anthony Roberts may also refer to:

 Anthony Roberts (basketball) (1955–1997), American basketball player
 Anthony Roberts (cricketer) (born 1962), South African cricketer
 Anthony Ellmaker Roberts (1803–1885), American politician
 Anthony K. Roberts (1939–2005), American actor and photographer

See also 
Tony Roberts (disambiguation)